The basketball competition in the 2009 Summer Universiade was held at different venues in Serbia on 1–11 July 2009.

Basketball – Men

Basketball – Women

Notes

 
Basketball
Summer Universiade
2009
Universiade